Rosedale Bible College (RBC) is a private evangelical Anabaptist junior Bible college in Rosedale, Ohio. RBC offers an Associate in Biblical Studies accredited by the Commission on Accreditation of the Association for Biblical Higher Education. The college  is owned by the Conservative Mennonite Conference, a coalition of roughly 120 widely scattered churches within the Mennonite family of faith, and united by a conservative evangelical and Anabaptist theology.

History 
RBC began in 1952 near the town of Berlin, Ohio, as a six-week Bible school that met in a local Mennonite church. The school was founded to equip students to grow spiritually and academically to serve effectively in the church and society. In 1964 the college moved to its present campus and became known as Rosedale Bible Institute. The ensuing years saw growth in both course offerings and length of the school year.  In conjunction with accreditation and degree granting privileges recognized by the Ohio Board of Regents, the institution changed its name in 2001 to Rosedale Bible College.

Currently the college serves approximately 70 students annually, a large majority of them coming from Mennonite congregations.  The ratio of men to women is generally 50/50.  The institution has roughly 7,000 alumni, with a relatively large number serving the church as missionaries, pastors, and ministry workers throughout the world.  A majority of RBC students transfer to four-year institutions to further their education.

Notes

References

External links 
 Official website

Association for Biblical Higher Education
Educational institutions established in 1952
Two-year colleges in the United States
Universities and colleges affiliated with the Mennonite Church
Seminaries and theological colleges in Ohio
Bible colleges
Education in Madison County, Ohio
Conservative Mennonites
1952 establishments in Ohio